The small-headed cod (Lepidion microcephalus) or the long-finned cod is a deepwater fish belonging to the morid cod family (Moridae), and related to the true cods (genus Gadus). It is found in the Tasman Sea, including the Bass Strait. It is commercially harvested by both Australia and New Zealand.

The second common name is because its first dorsal fin is made up of long, filamentous rays.  The pelvic fin is long, thin, and scythe-like, and it has a pronounced chin barbel.

The colour is grey-brown with a faint red tint on the body and black-edged median fins.

References
 
 
 Tony Ayling & Geoffrey Cox, Collins Guide to the Sea Fishes of New Zealand,  (William Collins Publishers Ltd, Auckland, New Zealand 1982) 

small-headed cod
Fauna of Victoria (Australia)
Marine fish of Tasmania
Marine fish of New Zealand
small-headed cod